The 2022–23 season is the 121st season in the history of Stade Rennais F.C. and their 29th consecutive season in the top flight. The club are participating in Ligue 1, the Coupe de France, and the UEFA Europa League.

Players

First-team squad

Out on loan

Transfers

In

Out

Pre-season and friendlies

Competitions

Overall record

Ligue 1

League table

Results summary

Results by round

Matches 
The league fixtures were announced on 17 June 2022.

Coupe de France

UEFA Europa League

Group stage 

The draw for the group stage was held on 26 August 2022.

Knockout phase

Knockout round play-offs 
The draw for the knockout round play-offs was held on 7 November 2022.

Statistics

Appearances and goals

|-
! colspan=14 style=background:#dcdcdc; text-align:center| Goalkeepers

|-
! colspan=14 style=background:#dcdcdc; text-align:center| Defenders

|-
! colspan=14 style=background:#dcdcdc; text-align:center| Midfielders

|-
! colspan=14 style=background:#dcdcdc; text-align:center| Forwards

|-
! colspan=14 style=background:#dcdcdc; text-align:center| Players transferred out during the season

References 

Stade Rennais F.C. seasons
Stade Rennais F.C.
2022–23 UEFA Europa League participants seasons